Backstage and Dangerous: The Private Rehearsal is a live album by the American rock band the Doors. It was recorded during a private rehearsal at the Aquarius Theatre in Hollywood on July 22, 1969, except "Jazzy Maggie M'Gill" (Disc 2 tracks 10 & 11) that was recorded during the concert soundcheck on July 21, 1969. Indeed, the band had played two concerts at the venue the previous day.

The album was released from the Bright Midnight Archives collection which contains a number of previously unreleased live concerts by the Doors.

Additional performance recordings made by the Doors at the Aquarius Theater appear on Live in Hollywood: Highlights from the Aquarius Theater Performances, Live at the Aquarius Theatre: The First Performance and Live at the Aquarius Theatre: The Second Performance.

Track listings
All songs written by the Doors except where noted.

Disc one

Disc two

 Vocals by Ray Manzarek

Personnel
Jim Morrison - vocals
Ray Manzarek - organ, keyboard bass
Robby Krieger - electric guitar
John Densmore - drums

References

External links
[ The album in Allmusic].

2002 live albums
Albums produced by Bruce Botnick
Albums recorded at the Aquarius Theater
Bright Midnight Archives